Palaemon ritteri is a species of shrimp of the family Palaemonidae. It lives in both the Atlantic and Pacific Oceans surrounding South America.

References

Crustaceans described in 1895
Palaemonidae
Crustaceans of South America